Ciara Torrance (born 1 September 1999) is a Scottish badminton player who competes in international level events. She is a Scottish National women's doubles champion, winning in 2020 with her partner Julie MacPherson. Torrance was part of team Scotland that won the bronze medal at the 2020 European Women's Team Championships.

Personal life 
Ciara Torrance graduated from the Glasgow School of Sport, based at Bellahouston Academy. Her brother, Ben Torrance, also a badminton player who competing in the national and international events.

Achievements

BWF International Challenge/Series (1 title, 1 runner-up) 
Women's doubles

Mixed doubles

  BWF International Challenge tournament
  BWF International Series tournament
  BWF Future Series tournament

BWF Junior International (1 title, 1 runner-up) 
Mixed doubles

  BWF Junior International Grand Prix tournament
  BWF Junior International Challenge tournament
  BWF Junior International Series tournament
  BWF Junior Future Series tournament

References

External links 
 

1999 births
Living people
People from Prestwick
Scottish female badminton players
Badminton players at the 2022 Commonwealth Games
Commonwealth Games competitors for Scotland